Gravitational Systems is an album by American jazz pianist Matthew Shipp featuring a duo with violinist Mat Maneri, which was recorded in 1998 and released on the Swiss hatOLOGY label. Shipp played previously with Maneri on the albums Critical Mass, The Flow of X and By the Law of Music, but this was their first duo performance. The recording includes a rendition of the English traditional song "Greensleeves" and a version of John Coltrane's classic "Naima".

Reception

In his review for AllMusic, Steve Loewy states that "Shipp is joined throughout by long-time collaborator, violinist Mat Maneri, whose perky and celebratory virtuosic runs are a perfect foil to the pianist's dense, sometimes morose underpinnings."
The All About Jazz review by Glenn Astarita says that "Gravitational Systems brings to light the irresistible tendencies and similar jazz vernaculars of two modern day jazz pioneers who jointly display a great deal of synergy, depth and heart."

Track listing
All compositions by Matthew Shipp except as indicated
 "Elasticity" – 4:48
 "Greensleeves" (Traditional) – 4:43
 "Series of Planes" – 5:31 
 "Knots" – 4:41
 "Notes" – 5:11
 "Two Elements" – 5:33
 "Landscape Harmony" – 8:33
 "Forcefield" – 8:19
 "Gravitational Systems" – 8:15 
 "Naima" (John Coltrane) – 3:16

Personnel
Matthew Shipp - piano
Mat Maneri – violin

References

2000 albums
Matthew Shipp albums
Hathut Records albums